Hattestad is a Norwegian surname. Notable people with the surname include:

Ola Vigen Hattestad (born 1982), Norwegian cross-country skier
Stine Lise Hattestad (born 1966), Norwegian freestyle skier
Trine Hattestad (born 1966), Norwegian javelin thrower

Norwegian-language surnames